The 1983–84 English Hockey League season took place from September 1983 until May 1984.

The principal event for men was the National Inter League Championship which brought together the winners of their respective regional leagues. The Men's championship was won by Neston

The Men's Cup was won by East Grinstead and the Women's Cup was won by Sheffield.

Men's Truman National Inter League Championship 
(Held at Willesden Leisure Centre, May 4–5)

Pool A

Pool B

Semi-finals & Final 

Neston
Chris Ashcroft, David Peters, Colin Cubley (capt), Phil McKeown, Mal Wilkinson, Stan Stannard, Tony Pickthall, John Royce, David Church, Pete Renshaw, Steve Greene
Lyons
B Potier, B deSouza, R Vikhu (capt), M Deegan, V Jolly, B Soor, R Rai, D Channa, M Shahzad, Sunny Soor, B Brar

Men's Cup (National Clubs Championship/Hockey Association Cup) 
The 1983-84 edition of the Men's Cup (the National Clubs Championship) saw a new trophy presented to the winners known as the Hockey Association Cup. In later years the competition would be known by this name.

Quarter-finals

Semi-finals

Final 
(Apr 14, Willesden Sports Centre)

East Grinstead
Ian Taylor, Michael Leman, Longstreet, G Lee, H Bently (M Thompson sub), Peter Head, Richard Leman, S Cole, James Leman, Bram van Asselt, Ian Westwood
Blackheath
Mohan Singh Kalsi, Harjinder Singh Dhami, Parminder Singh Kalsi, Brad Rehling, Brajinder Daved, Badar Butt, Albert De Souza, Peter Abreo, Cyril Nazareth (Shahid Khan sub), Imtiaz Sheikh, Nirmal Singh Kalsi

Women's Cup (National Clubs Championship) 
(Cheltenham, April 14–15)

Pool A

Pool B

Semi-finals & Final

References 

1983
field hockey
field hockey
1983 in field hockey
1984 in field hockey